HMS Active was a  of the Royal Navy. Built by Vosper Thornycroft, Southampton, England, she was completed with Exocet launchers in 'B' position, the first of the class to be so fitted.

Royal Navy service
Active participated in the Falklands War, setting out from HMNB Devonport on 10 May 1982 as part of the Bristol Group, reaching the task force on 21 May. Active formed part of the main British 
Fleet, well east of the Falklands during the day, while escorting supply convoys to San Carlos Water or carrying out shore bombardment missions at night. On the night of 13/14 June, Active shelled on Argentine positions during the Battle of Mount Tumbledown. HMS Active took part in five NGS (naval gun supports) at Bluff Cove, Fitzroy, Berkley Sound, Mount Tumbledown, and Port Stanley. By the mid-1980s, in common with the other surviving Type 21s, Active suffered from hull cracking. When the ship was next refitted steel plating was welded along each side of the ship to repair and reinforce the weak points. At the same time modifications were made to reduce hull noise.

When Hurricane Gilbert struck Jamaica and Grand Cayman, Active, supported by RFA Oakleaf, arrived in the area on 13 September 1988 to provided emergency relief, before leaving seven days later.

Pakistan Navy service

Active decommissioned and was sold to Pakistan on 23 September 1994, being renamed Shah Jahan. Exocet was not transferred to Pakistan and Shah Jahan had her obsolete Sea Cat launcher removed. Signaal DA08 air search radar replaced the Type 992 and SRBOC chaff launchers and 20 mm and 30 mm guns were fitted.

Her flag was sold on the BBC programme Bargain Hunt. Shah Jahan remains in service with the Pakistan Navy. Between 11 and 21 May 2008, Shah Jahan participated in Exercise Inspired Union, a multi-national exercises in the North Arabian Sea.

Shah Jahan was sunk as a target on 12 January 2021 as part of a Pakistan Navy live firing exercise.

Civilian connections
Active was the adopted ship of the town of Burnley in Lancashire, North-West England. The ship and its crew were granted the freedom of the town in 1989. Part of the town's inner ring-road between Westgate and the traffic lights at the Church Street junction with Colne Road is called Active Way. One of Active's anchors is displayed at the Anchor Retail Park next to Active Way.

References

Publications
 
 

 

Type 21 frigates
Cold War frigates of the United Kingdom
Falklands War naval ships of the United Kingdom
1972 ships
Ships built in Southampton